Susan Brison is Professor of Philosophy and Eunice and Julian Cohen Professor for the Study of Ethics and Human Values at Dartmouth College, where she also teaches in the Program in Women's, Gender, and Sexuality Studies.  For the 2016-17 academic year, she was the Laurance S. Rockefeller Visiting Professor for Distinguished Teaching at Princeton University.  She has also held visiting appointments at New York University, Tufts University, and Princeton University. Brison's work has succeeded in increasing the amount of attention that philosophy, as a field, pays to issues of rape and domestic violence.

Education and career
Brison graduated from the University of California, Santa Cruz with a bachelor's degree in philosophy, and went on to receive both a master's degree and a PhD from the University of Toronto.  She has also previously been a member of the Institute for Advanced Study, an independent postgraduate institution in New Jersey.

Research areas
Brison's work has covered a wide variety of areas including mental representation, free speech theory, sexual violence, and other issues in social, feminist, political, and legal philosophy.  Most of her work is tied together by the common theme of anti-individualism.  Brison is a politically engaged philosopher, and focuses on connecting her theory work with people's lived experiences, and looks for topics where she can use her analytic philosophic training to advance social justice. Brison also holds a much more limited view of the bounds of free speech than many of her contemporaries do, arguing that free speech can justifiably be limited.

Publications
Brison has written a number of articles in peer-reviewed journals and in anthologies, including pieces in Ethics, Nomos, and Legal Theory.

Brison has written one book, Aftermath, and co-edited a volume, Contemporary Perspectives On Constitutional Interpretation.  She is also co-authoring a forthcoming book called Debating Pornography, which talks about internal divisions in feminism that appeared in the 1970s and continue to this day about how best to approach the subject of pornography. Aftermath has been widely lauded, with Mimi Wesson describing Aftermath, writing in The Women's Review of Books, as a "lovely and inspiring volume."

Aftermath: Violence and the Remaking of a Self
Brison published Aftermath: Violence and the Remaking of a Self with the Princeton University Press in 2002. The book uses the personal lens of her own experience of being violently raped to examine the effects of sexual violence on identity, discussing the initial disintegration of identity that occurs with severe personal trauma and its subsequent reconstruction. While speaking of her lived experience, Brison argues that narratively understanding one's experience of rape can significantly help a survivor recover from harm. Aftermath has been described as Brison's attempt to rejoin two major parts of her life: she is a woman who has been sexually assaulted and also an analytic philosopher.

Anthology chapters

References

Living people
20th-century American philosophers
American women philosophers
Dartmouth College faculty
Year of birth missing (living people)
20th-century American women
21st-century American women